Max Frey (14 February 1902 – 26 November 1955) was an Austrian painter. His work was part of the painting event in the art competition at the 1948 Summer Olympics.

References

1902 births
1955 deaths
20th-century Austrian painters
Austrian male painters
Olympic competitors in art competitions
People from Klosterneuburg
20th-century Austrian male artists